Any vehicle used in or on water as well as underwater, including boats, ships, hovercraft and submarines, is a watercraft, also known as a water vessel or waterborne vessel. A watercraft usually has a propulsive capability (whether by sail, oar, paddle, or engine) and hence is distinct from a stationary device, such as a pontoon, that merely floats.

Types

Most watercraft may be described as either a ship or a boat. However, numerous items, including surfboards, underwater robots, seaplanes and torpedoes, may be considered neither ships nor boats.

Although ships are typically larger than boats, the distinction between those two categories is not one of size per se.
Ships are typically large ocean-going vessels; whereas boats are smaller, and typically travel most often on inland or coastal waters.
A rule of thumb says "a boat can fit on a ship, but a ship can't fit on a boat", and a ship usually has sufficient size to carry its own boats, such as lifeboats, dinghies, or runabouts.
Local law and regulation may define the exact size (or the number of masts) that distinguishes a ship from a boat.
Traditionally, submarines were called "boats", perhaps reflecting their cramped conditions: small size reduces the need for power, and thus the need to surface or snorkel for a supply of the air that running marine diesel engines requires; whereas, in contrast, nuclear-powered submarines' reactors supply power without consuming air, and such craft are large, much roomier, and classed as ships in some navies.
A merchant ship is any floating craft that transports cargo for the purpose of earning revenue. In this context, a passenger ship's "cargo" is its passengers.

The term "watercraft" (unlike such terms as aircraft or spacecraft) is rarely used to describe any individual object: rather the term serves to unify the category that ranges from jet skis to aircraft carriers.  Such a vessel may be used in saltwater and freshwater; for pleasure, recreation, physical exercise, commerce, transport or military missions.

Usage

Usually the purposes behind watercraft designs and skills are for seafaring education or leisure activities, fishing and resource extraction, transportation of cargo or passengers, and for conducting combat or salvage operations.  In general, the purpose of a water vehicle identifies its utility with a maritime industry sub-sector.

Design

The design from which a water vehicle is created usually seeks to achieve a balance between internal capacity (tonnage), speed and seaworthiness.  Tonnage is predominantly a consideration in transport operations, speed is important for warships, and safety is a primary consideration for less experienced or often smaller and less stable training and leisure vehicles.  This is due to the great level of regulatory compliance required by the larger watercraft, which ensures very infrequent instances of foundering at sea through application of extensive computer modeling and ship model basin testing before shipyard construction begins.

Propulsion
Historically, water vehicles have been propelled by people with poles, paddles, or oars, through manipulation of sails that propel by wind pressure and/or lift, and a variety of engineered machinery that create subsurface thrust through the process of internal combustion or electricity.  The technological history of watercraft in European history can be divided by reference to marine propulsion as simple paddle craft, oared galleys from the 8th century BCE until the 15th century, lateen sail during the Age of Discovery from the early 15th century and into the early 17th century, full-rigged ships of the Age of Sail from the 16th to the mid 19th century, the Age of Steam reciprocating marine steam engine roughly between 1770 and 1914, the steam turbine, later gas turbine, and internal combustion engines using diesel fuel, petrol and LNG as fuels from the turn of the 20th century, which have been supplemented to a degree by nuclear marine propulsion since the 1950s in some naval watercraft.  Current technological development seeks to identify cheaper, renewable and less polluting sources of propulsion for watercraft of all shapes and sizes.

Construction

Secondary applications of technology in watercraft have been those of used structural materials, navigation aids; and in the case of warships, weapon systems.  The purpose of usage and the physical environment define the materials used in construction which had historically included grasses, leather, timbers, metals combined with timber or without, silicate and plastic derivatives, and others.

Registration

Watercraft registration is the registration of a watercraft with a government authority. In the United States, it consists of an alphanumeric string called a vessel registration number that is issued  by the state's Department of Motor Vehicles.

Navigation
Navigation aids have varied over time: from astronomical observation, to mechanical mechanisms, and more recently analogue and digital computer devices that now rely on GPS systems.

Weapons
Naval weapon systems have closely followed the development in land weapons, developing from:
aircraft carriers
breech-loading rifled guns
direct enemy hull ramming to use of basic mechanical projectiles
firing shells
missiles and remotely piloted devices
naval mine layers and minesweeper
smooth-bore cannonball firing guns
torpedo-armed submarines
warships armed with fire control directed weapons

Until development of steam propulsion was coupled with rapid-firing breech-loading guns, naval combat was often concluded by a boarding combat between the opposing crews. Since the early 20th century, there has been a substantial development in technologies which allow force projection from a naval task force to a land objective using marine infantry.

See also

Canal
 Ferry
Glossary of nautical terms
IMO numbers
Lake freighter
Maritime history
Merchant vessel
Navigability
 Roll-on/roll-off
Ship registration
Ship transport
 Train ferry
Unmanned surface vehicle
Waterway

References

External links

The Canadian Museum of Civilization - Native Watercraft in Canada
A History of Recreational Small Watercraft 
Recreational Watercraft

 
Water transport
Naval architecture
Ship registration